The Chinese Ambassador to Latvia is the official representative of the People's Republic of China to the Republic of Latvia.

History

In 1991, after the independence of Latvia, the diplomatic relations with the People's Republic of China were established on 12 September 1991.

List of representatives

References 

 
Latvia
China